Thomas Gifford (June 1, 1854 – February 19, 1935) was a politician in British Columbia, Canada.

Born in 1854 in Lockerbie, Scotland, the son of William Gifford and Margaret Stewart, he was educated there and apprenticed as a jeweller. He opened his own store in Lockerbie around 1876. In 1877, he married Annie Stoddart. Thomas and his wife, along with sons William (b. 3 Jul 1878) and Thomas Stuart (b. 3 Jun 1880), emigrated to St. Paul, Minnesota in 1881.  Here, they had a daughter Margaret (b. 6 Apr 1882) and another son, James Stoddart (b. 26 Sep 1888), before moving again to New Westminster, British Columbia, Canada, where Gifford opened a jewelry store.  They had three more children - Julia Stuart (b. 8 Aug 1888), Hugh Wilson (b. 29 May 1892), and John Jardine (b. 25 Nov 1893) - and lived the rest of their lives in New Westminster. Gifford served as an alderman for New Westminster, as well as a member of the school board, hospital board and Board of Trade.

Thomas was elected to the Legislative Assembly of British Columbia in a 1901 by-election held after John Cunningham Brown was named to cabinet, and was re-elected in 1903, 1907, 1909 and 1912.

He died in New Westminster at the age of 81 in 1935.

References

1854 births
British Columbia Conservative Party MLAs
Scottish emigrants to Canada
1935 deaths
People from New Westminster